Eldon Howard was a British screenwriter. She was the mother-in-law of Edward J. Danziger and wrote a number of the screenplays for films by his company Danziger Productions.

Selected filmography
 A Woman of Mystery (1958)
 Three Crooked Men (1958)
 Moment of Indiscretion (1958) (with Brian Clemens)
 Innocent Meeting (1959)
 An Honourable Murder (1960)
 The Spider's Web (1960)
 The Tell-Tale Heart (1960)
 Highway to Battle (1961)
 Three Spare Wives (1962)

References

Sources
 Chibnall, Steve & McFarlane, Brian. The British 'B' Film. Palgrave MacMillan, 2009.

External links
 

Date of birth unknown
Date of death unknown
British screenwriters
British women screenwriters